Henricus Popta (3 May 1635 – 7 November 1712) was a Dutch lawyer.

Early life 
He was the second-oldest child. His older brother died before his birth. Born poor, he became rich.

His father, Tjebbe Jacobs Popta, was an alcoholic.

He was baptized on August 20, 1654.

Career 
He became what in Dutch is called Advocaat bij het hof, a relatively high position.

Poptaslot 
In 1687, he bought what would later be known as the Poptaslot. He decided that after his death it would never be inhabited again. He intended for it to be kept in the same state as when he died. To accomplish this he appointed four guardians, one of whom was his servant—an unusual choice in the period. The house became a museum. He provided housing for widows.

He also founded the charitable Poptagasthuis for women, which is now a monument.

Death 
He died on November 7, 1712 in Leeuwarden.

References

1635 births
1712 deaths
17th-century Dutch lawyers